Bert or Bertie Thomson may refer to:

Bert Thomson (bowls) (born 1927), Scottish international lawn bowler
Bert Thomson, musician with Eva Trout
Bert Thomson, councillor in South Lanarkshire Council election, 2012
Bertie Thomson (1907–1937), Scottish footballer
Bert Thomson (footballer, born 1929) (1929–2011), Scottish footballer, wing half for Rochdale

See also
Bert Thompson (disambiguation)
Herbert Thomson, engineer